The Hume is an economic rural region located in the north-eastern part of Victoria, Australia.

The Hume region is located along the two major interstate transport corridors – the Hume corridor and the Goulburn Valley corridor. The region comprises four distinct and inter-connected sub-regions or districts: Upper Hume, Central Hume, Goulburn Valley, and Lower Hume. The region is bounded by the Victorian Alps in the south and east, the New South Wales border defined by the Murray River in the north, the Loddon Mallee region in the west and the Greater Melbourne northern, western, and eastern metropolitan and Gippsland regions to the south.

Administration

Political representation 
For the purposes of Australian federal elections for the House of Representatives, the Hume region is contained within all or part of the electoral divisions of Bendigo, Indi, McEwen, and Nicholls.

For the purposes of Victorian elections for the Legislative Assembly, the Hume region is contained within all or part of the electoral districts of Benambra, Eildon, Euroa, Ovens Valley, and Shepparton.

Local government areas 
The region contains twelve local government areas and five unincorporated areas of Victoria, which are:

Environmental protection 
The Hume region contains many protected areas such as Barmah, Burrowa-Pine Mountain and Chiltern-Mt Pilot national parks; and the Winton Wetlands restoration site.

See also

 Geography of Victoria
 Regions of Victoria

Notes

References

External links